is an English contract law and English property law case on exclusion clauses and bailment. It is best known for Denning LJ's "red hand rule" comment, where he said,

Facts
J Spurling Ltd had a warehouse in East London. Mr Andrew Bradshaw had seven barrels of orange juice. He asked Spurling Ltd to store them. In the contract was the "London lighterage clause" which exempted warehousemen from liability due to their negligence. When the barrels were collected, they were damaged. When Bradshaw refused to pay Spurling Ltd, the company sued for the cost. Bradshaw counterclaimed for damages for breach of an implied term of a contract of bailment to take reasonable care.

Judgment
Denning LJ, Morris LJ and Parker LJ held that although the warehouse employees were negligent, the clause effectively exempted them.

Denning LJ's judgment went as follows. Note that his reference to the concept of a fundamental breach precluding an exclusion of liability was rejected by the House of Lords some years later in Photo Production Ltd v Securicor Transport Ltd [1980] AC 827.

See also
Thornton v Shoe Lane Parking Ltd

Notes

English property case law
1956 in England
Lord Denning cases
English incorporation case law
Court of Appeal (England and Wales) cases
1956 in case law
1956 in British law